This is a list of species in the lichen genus Caloplaca. Although there were estimated to be more than 500 species in 2008, the family Teloschistaceae has undergone major revisions since then. Several molecular phylogenetic studies have been published that have established a phylogenetic framework to more appropriately classify lichens that were previously grouped in Caloplaca. , Species Fungorum accepts 202 species of Caloplaca.

A

Caloplaca abbreviata 
Caloplaca abuensis 
Caloplaca adnexa 
Caloplaca agrata 
Caloplaca ahtii 
Caloplaca akbarica 
Caloplaca albopruinosa 
Caloplaca albovariegata 
Caloplaca alcarum 
Caloplaca aliciae 
Caloplaca allanii 
Caloplaca almbornii 
Caloplaca amsterdamensis 
Caloplaca anularis 
Caloplaca arandensis 
Caloplaca archeri 
Caloplaca areolata 
Caloplaca aseptatospora 
Caloplaca astonii 
Caloplaca atroalba 
Caloplaca atrosanguinea 
Caloplaca aurea 
Caloplaca austroatlantica 
Caloplaca austromaritima

B
Caloplaca bartlettii 
Caloplaca baueri  
Caloplaca beaugleholei 
Caloplaca begaensis 
Caloplaca bellemerei 
Caloplaca bispora 
Caloplaca blastidiomaritima 
Caloplaca boergesenii 
Caloplaca borreri 
Caloplaca brittonii 
Caloplaca brunneola 
Caloplaca bullata 
Caloplaca byrsonimae

C
Caloplaca caesiorufa 
Caloplaca caesiorufella 
Caloplaca calicioides 
Caloplaca cerina 
Caloplaca chlorina 
Caloplaca cinnamomea 
Caloplaca clauzadeana 
Caloplaca clavatoisidiata 
Caloplaca clavigera 
Caloplaca coaddita 
Caloplaca coeruleofrigida 
Caloplaca concilians 
Caloplaca conjungens 
Caloplaca conranii 
Caloplaca coreana 
Caloplaca craggyensis 
Caloplaca cravensis 
Caloplaca crocea 
Caloplaca crocina 
Caloplaca crozetica 
Caloplaca cupulifera

D
Caloplaca depauperata 
Caloplaca diphasia 
Caloplaca dorrigoensis 
Caloplaca dzhankoiensis

E

Caloplaca elaeophora 
Caloplaca elixii 
Caloplaca elvebakkiana 
Caloplaca endodermia 
Caloplaca epiborya 
Caloplaca epibrya 
Caloplaca epiphora 
Caloplaca erythrocarpa 
Caloplaca eugyra

F
Caloplaca festivella 
Caloplaca feuereri 
Caloplaca filsonii 
Caloplaca filsoniorum 
Caloplaca fissurata 
Caloplaca floridana 
Caloplaca fraserensis 
Caloplaca fulva

G
Caloplaca gambiensis 
Caloplaca granularis 
Caloplaca gyalectoides 
Caloplaca gypsicola 
Caloplaca gyrophorica

H
Caloplaca haematites 
Caloplaca haematodes 
Caloplaca haematommona 
Caloplaca hafellneri 
Caloplaca hakkodensis 
Caloplaca hallasanensis 
Caloplaca hanneshertelii 
Caloplaca herbidella 
Caloplaca hexaspora 
Caloplaca himalayana 
Caloplaca hopetounensis 
Caloplaca hueana

I
Caloplaca ignea 
Caloplaca inclinans 
Caloplaca indica 
Caloplaca irrubescens 
Caloplaca isidiosa 
Caloplaca isidiosella 
Caloplaca isidiosissimus  – Costa Rica
Caloplaca itiana

J
Caloplaca jatolensis  – India
Caloplaca jemtlandica 
Caloplaca johnwhinrayi 
Caloplaca juniperi

K
Caloplaca karadagensis 
Caloplaca kashmirensis 
Caloplaca kedrovopadensis 
Caloplaca kiewkaensis 
Caloplaca kurzii

L
Caloplaca lactea 
Caloplaca lagunensis 
Caloplaca lecanorae 
Caloplaca lecanorocarpa 
Caloplaca lecanoroides 
Caloplaca lecapustulata 
Caloplaca leptozona 
Caloplaca letrouitioides 
Caloplaca lignicola 
Caloplaca lithophila 
Caloplaca litoricola 
Caloplaca littorea 
Caloplaca lucy-beatrice-mooreae 
Caloplaca lypera

M

Caloplaca macquariensis 
Caloplaca maculata 
Caloplaca magellanica 
Caloplaca magnetensis 
Caloplaca magni-filii 
Caloplaca magnussoniana 
Caloplaca mallacootensis 
Caloplaca marchantiorum 
Caloplaca megalariicola  – Falkland Islands
Caloplaca michoacanensis 
Caloplaca microloba 
Caloplaca microthallina 
Caloplaca monacensis 
Caloplaca montenegrensis 
Caloplaca murrayi

N
Caloplaca nana 
Caloplaca neotropica 
Caloplaca nigrocarpa 
Caloplaca norfolkensis 
Caloplaca nuraki

O

Caloplaca obamae 
Caloplaca obesimarginata 
Caloplaca obscurella 
Caloplaca ochracea 
Caloplaca ochrochroa 
Caloplaca ochrolechioides 
Caloplaca ochroleuca 
Caloplaca orloviana

P
Caloplaca pacifica 
Caloplaca papanui 
Caloplaca parvula 
Caloplaca patwolseleyae 
Caloplaca pellodella 
Caloplaca phaeantha 
Caloplaca phaeocincta 
Caloplaca pinicola 
Caloplaca piscatorica 
Caloplaca pseudisteroides  – India
Caloplaca pseudocitrina 
Caloplaca pseudofulgensia 
Caloplaca psoromatis 
Caloplaca pulicarioides 
Caloplaca pygmaea

Q
Caloplaca queenslandica

R
Caloplaca raesaenenii 
Caloplaca rexii 
Caloplaca rossii 
Caloplaca rubelliana 
Caloplaca rubens 
Caloplaca rubentior 
Caloplaca ruderum

S

Caloplaca sarcopidoides 
Caloplaca saviczii 
Caloplaca schisticola 
Caloplaca schoeferi 
Caloplaca schisticola 
Caloplaca schwarzii 
Caloplaca scolecomarginata 
Caloplaca sconensis 
Caloplaca seawardii 
Caloplaca sideritis 
Caloplaca sipmanii 
Caloplaca sol 
Caloplaca sonorae 
Caloplaca soredians 
Caloplaca squamuloisidiata 
Caloplaca stanfordensis 
Caloplaca sterilis 
Caloplaca stewartensis 
Caloplaca streimannii 
Caloplaca subalpina 
Caloplaca subbassiae 
Caloplaca subconcilians 
Caloplaca subleptozona  – India
Caloplaca subochrochroa 
Caloplaca subpoliotera 
Caloplaca subrubelliana 
Caloplaca subsaxicola 
Caloplaca subscopularis 
Caloplaca subsquamosa 
Caloplaca subunicolor

T
Caloplaca teicholyta 
Caloplaca tephromelae  – Australia
Caloplaca thracopontica 
Caloplaca thuringiaca  – Europe
Caloplaca tibellii 
Caloplaca tomnashii 
Caloplaca tropica 
Caloplaca turkuensis

U
Caloplaca ulcerata 
Caloplaca ulleungensis 
Caloplaca ulmorum 
Caloplaca umbrinofusca 
Caloplaca urceolata 
Caloplaca ursina

V
Caloplaca vainioi 
Caloplaca virescens 
Caloplaca viridirufa 
Caloplaca vitellinaria 
Caloplaca volkii 
Caloplaca vorukhica

W
Caloplaca wallabyensis 
Caloplaca wasseri 
Caloplaca wesselsii 
Caloplaca wrightii

X
Caloplaca xanthobola 
Caloplaca xanthopa 
Caloplaca xerica 
Caloplaca xochitepea 
Caloplaca xochitepecensis

Y
Caloplaca yammeraensis 
Caloplaca yeosuensis

Z
Caloplaca zavattarii 
Caloplaca zeorina  – China

References

Caloplaca